This glossary of computer software terms lists the general terms related to computer software, and related fields, as commonly used in Wikipedia articles.

Glossary

See also

 Outline of computer programming
 Outline of software
 Software

References

software
Wikipedia glossaries using description lists